Histone H2A.J is a protein that in humans is encoded by the H2AFJ gene.

Histones are basic nuclear proteins that are responsible for the nucleosome structure of the chromosomal fiber in eukaryotes. Nucleosomes consist of approximately 146 bp of DNA wrapped around a histone octamer composed of pairs of each of the four core histones (H2A, H2B, H3, and H4). The chromatin fiber is further compacted through the interaction of a linker histone, H1, with the DNA between the nucleosomes to form higher order chromatin structures. This gene is located on chromosome 12 and encodes a variant H2A histone. The protein is divergent at the C-terminus compared to the consensus H2A histone family member.

References

Further reading